Subdivision is an administrative unit below district level and above the block or Tehsil level in the state West Bengal of India. Presently there are 69 subdivisions in 23 districts of West Bengal. Subdivisions are a group of blocks and it is administered by Sub-divisional Officer (SDO) also called as Sub-divisional Magistrate (SDM).

References

1st in list